United Nations Security Council Resolution 137, adopted on May 31, 1960, noted with regret the death of Judge Sir Hersch Lauterpacht on May 8.  The Council then decided that in accordance with the Statute of the Court the resulting vacancy in the International Court of Justice would be resolved by an election in the General Assembly that would take place during the fifteenth session of that body.

The resolution was adopted without vote.

See also
List of United Nations Security Council Resolutions 101 to 200 (1953–1965)

References
Text of the Resolution at undocs.org

External links
 

 0137
 0137
May 1960 events